The Tekke of Dollmë or Haxhi Mustafa Baba Tekke is a Cultural Monument of Albania, located in Lagjja Kala, Krujë. Before its destruction by the Communist dictatorship, the tekke of Krujë had 360 holy graves and was known as "Little Khorasan".

It is located in the southern corner of the fortress of Kruja.

History 

The tekke was built in 1193 AH (1779–1780 AD) by Adem Aga Toptani (d. 1784), whose marble tomb is inside the tekke. It may have originally been a mosque instead of a Sufi shrine, since there is a mihrab (prayer niche) inside. Pilgrims gathered at the tekke on the feast day of August 11.

The Dollma family is buried inside, and some of the graves are revered as shrines:
Shrine of Baba Mustafa Dollma
Shrine of Hysen Dollma, a dervish

References

Cultural Monuments of Albania
Sufi tekkes in Albania
Bektashi Order
Buildings and structures in Krujë
Ottoman mausoleums